Ruddlesden-Popper (RP) phases are a type of  perovskite structure that consists of two-dimensional perovskite-like slabs interleaved with cations. The general formula of an RP phase is An+1BnX3n+1, where A and B are cations, X is an anion (e.g., oxygen), and n is the number of octahedral layers in the perovskite-like stack. Generally, it has a phase structure that results from the intergrowth of perovskite-type and NaCl-type (i.e., rocksalt-type) structures.
	
These phases are named after S.N. Ruddlesden and P. Popper, who first synthesized and described a Ruddlesden-Popper structure in 1957.

Crystal structure

The general RP formula An+1BnX3n+1 can be written An-1A’2BnX3n+1, where A and A’ are alkali, alkaline earth, or rare earth metals and B is a transition metal. The A cations are located in the perovskite layer and are 12-fold cuboctahedral coordinated by the anions (CN = 12). The A’ cations have a coordination number of 9 (CN = 9) and are located at the boundary between the perovskite layer and an intermediate block layer. The B cations are located inside the anionic octahedra, pyramids and squares.

Synthesis

The first series of Ruddlesden-Popper phases, Sr2TiO4, Ca2MnO4 and SrLaAlO4, were confirmed by powder X-ray diffraction (PXRD) in 1957. These compounds were formed by heating up the appropriate oxides and carbonates in the correct proportions.

In recent years, interest in perovskite-like structures has been growing and methods for synthesizing these compounds have been further developed. In contrast to the conventional solid-state method, chimie douce or soft chemistry techniques are often utilized to synthesize this class of materials. These soft chemistry techniques include ion-exchange reactions of layered perovskites, ion-exchange reactions involving interlayer structural units, topochemical condensation reactions and other techniques such as intercalation-deintercalation reactions and multistep intercalation reactions of layer perovskite.

Applications
Similar to the parent perovskite phases, Ruddlesden-Popper phases can possess interesting properties such as colossal magnetoresistance, superconductivity, ferroelectricity, catalytic activity, white light emitting diodes, scintillators, fuel cell, and solar cells.

Using Ruddlesden-Popper perovskite as light-emitting diodes has the advantages of low-cost solution-processing, tunable bandgap, and better stability compared to 3D perovskite. In 2018, Mohite et al. achieved a 14 hours stable operation of 2D (CH3(CH2)3NH3)2(CH3NH3)n-1PbnI3n+1 Ruddlesden-Popper perovskite thin films as light-emitting diodes under operating conditions, while 3D perovskite as light-emitting diodes could degrade within minutes.

The Ruddlesden-Popper perovskite can be used as solar cells, like common 3D perovskite. While it generally possesses lower power conversion efficiency (PCE) than 3D perovskites, it has been proven to have better stability. In 2021, using 4-chlore-phenylformamidinium (CPFA) as spacer cation in Ruddlesden-Popper perovskite thin films was studied by Yang et al. CPFA2MAn-1Pbn(I0.857Cl0.143)3n+1 perovskite thin film can still have ~80% of its original PCE, which is 14.78%, after 2000 hours storage under ambient conditions.

The Ruddlesden-Popper phase LaSr3Fe3O10 is an example of a layered perovskite being developed for use in rechargeable metal-air batteries. Due to the layered nature of Ruddlesden-Popper structures, the oxygen located between the perovskite layers is easily removed. The ease of removing the oxygen atoms is responsible for the efficiency of the oxygen evolution reaction (OER) and oxygen reduction reaction (ORR) in the material. In a metal-air battery, OER is the process of charging that occurs at the air electrode, while ORR is the discharging reaction.

The Ruddlesden-Popper phase perovskites are also prospective candidate materials in energy storage devices. The formula of (R-NH3)2An-1BnX3n+1 are being developed for solar cell. Here, R-NH3+ is long organic chain or cyclic ammonium cation, A is methylamine (MA) or formamidine (FA), B is Pb or Sn, and X is halogen ions. The Ruddlesden-Popper perovskites can also be used for cathode materials of solid oxide fuel cells (SOFC)

References

Perovskites